Boavistensis is Latin for "of the island of Boa Vista", an island of Cape Verde. It may refer to several species found on the island and in the surrounding waters:

Conus boavistensis, a species of cone snails
Euthria boavistensis, a species of true whelks
Hemidactylus boavistensis, a species of geckos
Manzonia boavistensis, a species of minute sea snail
Pentagonica boavistensis, a species of beetles
Tarentola boavistensis, a species of wall geckos

It also may refer to a subspecies:
Agaronia acuminata boavistensis, a subspecies of Agaronia acuminata
Chioniina spinalis boavistensis, a subspecies of Chioninia spinalis